Colerne Airfield , now known as Azimghur Barracks, is a British Army facility just north-west of the village of Colerne, Wiltshire, England.

History
RAF Colerne was opened on this site in 1940, and was in operation until 1976. From 1940 to 1955, RAF Fighter Command units were based here. During the Battle of Britain the airfield served as a satellite field to RAF Middle Wallop, and squadrons rotated back and forth from there on a daily basis.

Present day 
The site is a ground station for the Skynet 5 military satellite system that provides battlefield support (e.g. real-time imagery from remote-piloted drones in various theatres of war). It is in close proximity to the underground Corsham Computer Centre.

The site is also the location of Azimghur Barracks, home to 21 Signal Regiment.

The airfield is used by Air Cadets and 3 Air Experience Flight, and is the headquarters of Bristol University Air Squadron, a Volunteer Reserve unit which recruits from several universities in south-west England.

Future 
In November 2016, the Ministry of Defence announced that the airfield would close in 2018 (later extended to 2025), and Azimghur Barracks in 2031 (later brought forward to 2029).

References

History of Wiltshire
Airports in South West England